This is a list of fauna of the Scottish Highlands.

Mammals 
European beaver (reintroduced)
Badger
European otter
Field vole
Goat
Gray wolf (extinct)
Mink (invasive)
Moose (reintroduced)
Mountain hare
Pine marten
Red deer
Red fox
Red squirrel
Reindeer (reintroduced)
Roe deer
Scottish wildcat
Sheep
Stoat
Water vole
Scottish highland cattle

Birds 
Black grouse
Black-throated diver
Common buzzard
Western capercaillie
Common gull
Common sandpiper
Common cuckoo
Eurasian curlew
White-throated dipper
Eurasian dotterel
Dunlin
Golden eagle
Great skua
Common greenshank
Greylag goose
Hen harrier
Hooded crow
Meadow pipit
 Merlin
Osprey
Peregrine falcon
Ptarmigan
Common raven
Red grouse
Red kite (reintroduced)
Red-throated diver
Ring ouzel
Scottish crossbill — endemic
Common snipe
Snow bunting
European stonechat
Northern wheatear
White-tailed eagle

Reptiles 
Adder
Viviparous lizard

Amphibians 
Common frog
Palmate newt

Fish 
Charr
Salmon
Trout

Insects

Beetles 
Green tiger beetle
Ground beetle

Bees 
Bilberry bumblebee
Heath bumblebee

Butterflies and moths 
Large heath butterfly
Mountain ringlet butterfly
Scotch argus butterfly
Black mountain moth
Emperor moth
Fox moth
Magpie moth
Mountain burnet moth
Northern dart moth
Northern eggar moth

Dragonflies 
Azure hawker dragonfly
Four-spotted chaser dragonfly
Golden-ringed dragonfly

Other 
Cranefly
Deer ked
Midge
Sheep tick

Sources 
Kempe and Wrightham, Hostile Habitats: Scotland's Mountain Environment Scottish Mountaineering Trust 2006,

See also
Fauna of Scotland

Fauna
LIst